Geometry is a branch of mathematics concerned with questions of shape, size, relative position of figures, and the properties of space. Geometry is one of the oldest mathematical sciences.

Classical branches 

 Geometry —
 Analytic geometry —
 Differential geometry —
 Euclidean geometry —
 Non-Euclidean geometry —
 Projective geometry —
 Riemannian geometry —

Contemporary branches 
 Absolute geometry
 Affine geometry
 Archimedes' use of infinitesimals
 Birational geometry
 Complex geometry
 Combinatorial geometry
 Computational geometry
 Conformal geometry
 Constructive solid geometry
 Contact geometry
 Convex geometry
 Descriptive geometry
 Digital geometry
 Discrete geometry
 Distance geometry
 Elliptic geometry
 Enumerative geometry
 Epipolar geometry
 Finite geometry
 Geometry of numbers
 Hyperbolic geometry
 Incidence geometry
 Information geometry
 Integral geometry
 Inversive geometry
 Klein geometry
 Lie sphere geometry
 Numerical geometry
 Ordered geometry
 Parabolic geometry
 Plane geometry
 Quantum geometry
 Ruppeiner geometry
 Spherical geometry
 Symplectic geometry
 Synthetic geometry
 Systolic geometry
 Taxicab geometry
 Toric geometry
 Transformation geometry
 Tropical geometry

History of geometry

History of geometry
 Timeline of geometry
 Babylonian geometry
 Egyptian geometry
 Ancient Greek geometry
 Euclidean geometry
 Pythagorean theorem
 Euclid's Elements
 Measurement of a Circle
 Indian mathematics
 Bakhshali manuscript
 Modern geometry
 History of analytic geometry
 History of the Cartesian coordinate system
 History of non-Euclidean geometry
 History of topology
 History of algebraic geometry

General geometry concepts

General concepts

 Geometric progression — Geometric shape — Geometry — Pi — angular velocity — linear velocity — De Moivre's theorem — parallelogram rule — Pythagorean theorem — similar triangles — trigonometric identity — unit circle — Trapezoid — Triangle — Theorem — point — ray — plane — line — line segment

Measurements

 Bearing
 Angle
 Degree
 Minute
 Radian
 Circumference
 Diameter

Trigonometric functions

 Trigonometric function
 Asymptotes
 Circular functions
 Periodic functions
 Law of cosines
 Law of sines

Vectors

 Amplitude
 Dot product
 Norm (mathematics) (also known as magnitude)
 Position vector
 Scalar multiplication
 Vector addition
 Zero vector

Vector spaces and complex dimensions

 Complex plane
 Imaginary axis
 Linear interpolation
 One-to-one
 Orthogonal
 Polar coordinate system
 Pole
 Real axis
 Secant line
 CIrcular sector or "sector"
 Semiperimeter

Lists

 List of mathematical shapes
 List of geometers
 List of curves
 List of curves topics

See also

 List of basic mathematics topics
 List of mathematics articles
 Table of mathematical symbols

Further reading

External links

Geometry
Geometry
 
Geometry